Juana Aidé Huancahuari Páucar is an ethnic Quechua Peruvian politician. She was a Congresswoman representing Ayacucho for the period 2006–2011, and belongs to the Union for Peru party.

References

1969 births
Living people
People from Lima
Union for Peru politicians
Members of the Congress of the Republic of Peru
Quechua politicians
Women members of the Congress of the Republic of Peru